The 1991 NCAA Division I Men's Golf Championships were contested at the 53rd annual NCAA-sanctioned golf tournament for determining the individual and team national champions of men's collegiate golf at the Division I level in the United States.

The tournament was held at the Poppy Hills Golf Course in Pebble Beach, California.

Oklahoma State won the team championship, the Cowboys' seventh NCAA title and first since 1987.

Warren Schutte, from UNLV, won the individual title.

Individual results

Individual champion
 Warren Schutte, UNLV (283)

Team results

Finalists

DC = Defending champions
Debut appearance

References

NCAA Men's Golf Championship
Golf in California
NCAA Golf Championship
NCAA Golf Championship
NCAA Golf Championship